Serous cystadenocarcinoma is a type of tumor in the cystadenocarcinoma grouping.

Most commonly, the primary site of serous cystadenocarcinoma is the ovary. Rare occurrence in the pancreas has been reported, although this is not typical, with the majority of microcystic pancreatic masses representing alternate disease processes such as the more benign serous cystadenoma.

References 

Gynaecological cancer